The 2017 Heat Latin Music Awards were held on June 8, 2017 at Cap Cana, Dominican Republic, and was broadcast live through HTV and TBS. The ceremony was hosted by Clarissa Molina and Enrique Santos. The awards celebrates the year's biggest Latin music acts. Farruko and J Balvin led the nominations with four each, followed by Lali and Maluma, with three each. Balvin was the bigger winner of the night with three trophies, including Best Music Video for "Bobo", Best Male Artist and Best Urban Artist".

Performances

Presenters
 Joey Montana and Farina — presented Best Tropical Artist
 Corina Smith and Gustavo Elis — presented Best Artist Andean Region
 Emeraude Toubia and Jonathan Molly — presented Best Rock Artist
 Techy Fatule and Jiggy Drama — presented Best Artist Southern Region
 Pipe Peláez and Adriana Lucía — presented Best Band/Group
 Alejandro González and Ozuna — presented Best Female Artist
 San Luis and Mariela Encarnación — presented Best Pop Artist
 Alexis & Fido and Covi Quintana — presented Engagement Award
 Mirella Cesa and Mr. Black — presented Best Artist Northern Region
 Karol G and Pasabordo — presented Best Male Artist
 Mia La Pretty Girl, Pipe Bueno and Mark B — presented Best New Artist
 Domino Saints and Vi-Em — presented Best Urban Artist
 Ricardo Montaner — presented Gold Award
 Mike Bahía and Greeicy Rendón — presented Best Music Video

Nominees
Source:

References

2017 music awards
2017 in Latin music